Wibbel the Tailor (German: Schneider Wibbel) is a 1939 German historical comedy film directed by Viktor de Kowa and starring Erich Ponto, Fita Benkhoff and Irene von Meyendorff. It is an adaptation of the 1913 play Wibbel the Tailor by Hans Müller-Schlösser. It is set in Düsseldorf during its occupation by French troops during the Napoleonic Wars (1803-1815).

Cast
 Erich Ponto as Anton Wibbel the tailor 
 Fita Benkhoff as Fin, his wife
 Irene von Meyendorff as Klementine, nicknamed 'Tinchen'
 Friedrich Benfer as André
 Theo Lucas as Mölfes
 Günther Lüders as tailor journeyman Peter Zimpel / Heinz Zimpel
 Lotte Rausch as Mariechen
 Ludwig Schmitz as Drögendiek  
 Albert Florath as Totengräber  
 Eva Tinschmann as Frau Heubes  
 Paul Heidemann as Kommissar  
 Rudolf Klein-Rogge as Pangdich  
 Hubert von Meyerinck as Knillich
 Walter Lieck as Fitzkes 
 Hans Adalbert Schlettow as Heubes 
 S.O. Schoening as Picard  
 Max Wilmsen as Krönkel 
 Christine von Trümbach as Frau Krönkel  
 Boris Alekin as Louis  
 Marga Riffa as Frau Pangdich  
 Maria Krahn    
 Hans Hemes
 Wolfgang Dohnberg 
 Robert Forsch 
 Artur Malkowsky 
 Albert Probeck
 Else Beyer-Andrae 
 Elsa Dalands  
 Jac Diehl
 Karl Heitmann   
 Hilde Munsch 
 Gerda Peter  
 Lucie Polzin
 Ilse Pütz  
 Paul Rehkopf
 Theodor Thony  
 Auguste Wanner-Kirsch   
 Franz Weber

References

Bibliography 
 Goble, Alan. The Complete Index to Literary Sources in Film. Walter de Gruyter, 1 Jan 1999.

External links 
 

1939 films
1930s historical comedy films
German historical comedy films
Films of Nazi Germany
1930s German-language films
Films directed by Viktor de Kowa
Films set in the 1810s
Films set in Düsseldorf
German films based on plays
Remakes of German films
German black-and-white films
Tobis Film films
Napoleonic Wars films
1939 comedy films
1930s German films